Edworthia is an extinct genus of paromomyid plesiadapiform which existed in Alberta, Canada, during the early Paleocene (middle Torrejonian age). It was first named by Richard C. Fox, Craig S. Scott and Brian D. Rankin in 2010 and the type species is Edworthia lerbekmoi. Edworthia described from a recently discovered locality in the Paskapoo Formation, exposed at a road cut in Edworthy Municipal Park.

References

Plesiadapiformes
Prehistoric placental genera
Paleocene mammals
Fossil taxa described in 2010
Fossils of Canada
Paleontology in Alberta